Buford's Massacre Site, also known as Buford's Battleground, is a historic site and national historic district located near Lancaster, South Carolina.  Two monuments at the site mark the battleground where the Battle of Waxhaws (also known as Buford's massacre) took place. A white monument ten feet tall, erected on June 2, 1860, marked the gravesite of American soldiers who died during the battle. This marker was gradually damaged over time by souvenir hunters who chipped off pieces, which led local authorities to erect a new monument on May 1, 1955, bearing the same inscription. The Battle of Waxhaws was a minor engagement during the American Revolutionary War between the Continental Army and Loyalist forces led by British colonel Banastre Tarleton, who became known as "Bloody Tarleton" as a result of accusations that his men massacred wounded American soldiers during the battle.

It was added to the National Register of Historic Places in 1990.

References

American Revolutionary War monuments and memorials
Monuments and memorials on the National Register of Historic Places in South Carolina
Historic districts on the National Register of Historic Places in South Carolina
Buildings and structures completed in 1860
Buildings and structures in Lancaster County, South Carolina
National Register of Historic Places in Lancaster County, South Carolina
American Revolution on the National Register of Historic Places
Obelisks in the United States